The Free India Centre was the European branch of the Azad Hind,  provisional government led by Subhas Chandra Bose. It was founded by Bose when he was in Nazi Germany in 1942, and headed by A. C. N. Nambiar.

Its responsibilities included managing relations with the European Axis powers, supporting and recruiting volunteers for the Indian Legion of the Waffen-SS, running Azad Hind Radio, and preparing for the much larger provisional government that was formed in southeast Asia with Japanese support. While its main base was in Berlin, it also had branch offices in occupied Paris and in Italy. On its establishment in Berlin, the Free India Centre was essentially given the status of a diplomatic mission by Nazi Germany. It had an office at No. 2A Lichtensteiner Allee in Tiergarten, although its activities were for some time mostly conducted in hotels or Bose's eventual house on Sophienstrasse in Charlottenburg.

References 

Defunct diplomatic missions
Azad Hind
Subhas Chandra Bose
1942 establishments in Germany
Diplomatic missions in Berlin